Census Division No. 23 (Churchill - Northern Manitoba) is a census division located within the Northern Region of the Province of Manitoba, Canada. Unlike in some other provinces, census divisions do not reflect the organization of local government in Manitoba. These areas exist solely for the purposes of statistical analysis and presentation; they have no government of their own.

The census division contains the Atlantic deep sea Port of Churchill. 

The population of the census division was 8,252 in the 2006 census. The census division has a very diversified economic base ranging from mining, forestry, trapping, transportation and arctic resupply.

Demographics 

Towns

 Churchill
 Gillam
 Leaf Rapids
 Lynn Lake

Unincorporated communities
 Amery
 Belcher
 Charlebois
 Herchmer
 Lawledge
 Weir River

First Nations reserves
 Brochet 197
 Fox Lake 2
 Granville Lake
 Highrock 199
 Lac Brochet 197A
 Pukatawagan 198
 Shamattawa 1
 South Indian Lake

Unorganized areas

 Unorganized Division No. 23

See also

 Northern Manitoba

References

External links
 Manitoba Community Profiles: Churchill - Northern Manitoba
 Map of Division No. 23, Manitoba at Statcan 

23
Northern Region, Manitoba